Girin may refer to:
 Qilin, Girin in Korean
 Girin-myeon, a township in South Korea
 Jilin City, historical alternative romanization was Girin.

See also
 Keirin, a form of motor-paced cycle racing
 Kirin (disambiguation)
 Kirin no Tsubasa, a 2012 Japanese film
 Kirino (disambiguation)
 Kylin (disambiguation)
 Qilin (disambiguation)
 Xilin (disambiguation)